Metta is a given name. Notable people with the name include:

Metta Fock (1765–1810), Swedish noble and sentenced murderer
Metta Permadi (born 1989), Indonesian actress
Metta Spencer (born 1931), Canadian sociologist
Metta von Oberg (1737–1794), German baroness
Metta Sandiford-Artest (born 1979), American basketball coach and former player

See also

 LaMetta Wynn (1933–2021), U.S. politician

Meta (name), given name and surname
Metta (disambiguation)

Feminine given names
Given names derived from gemstones